This is a list of the mammal species recorded in Uzbekistan. There are 98 mammal species in Uzbekistan, of which one is critically endangered, three are endangered, six are vulnerable, and four are near threatened.

The following tags are used to highlight each species' conservation status as assessed by the International Union for Conservation of Nature:

Order: Rodentia (rodents) 

Rodents make up the largest order of mammals, with over 40% of mammalian species. They have two incisors in the upper and lower jaw which grow continually and must be kept short by gnawing.

Suborder: Sciurognathi
Family: Sciuridae (squirrels)
Subfamily: Xerinae
Tribe: Xerini
Genus: Spermophilopsis
 Long-clawed ground squirrel, S. leptodactylus 
Tribe: Marmotini
Genus: Marmota
 Long-tailed marmot, M. caudata 
 Menzbier's marmot, M. menzbieri 
Genus: Spermophilus
 Yellow ground squirrel, Spermophilus fulvus
 Little ground squirrel, Spermophilus pygmaeus
Family: Gliridae (dormice)
Subfamily: Leithiinae
Genus: Dryomys
 Forest dormouse, Dryomys nitedula
Family: Dipodidae (jerboas)
Subfamily: Allactaginae
Genus: Allactaga
 Great jerboa, Allactaga major
 Severtzov's jerboa, Allactaga severtzovi
 Vinogradov's jerboa, Allactaga vinogradovi
Genus: Allactodipus
 Bobrinski's jerboa, Allactodipus bobrinskii
Subfamily: Cardiocraniinae
Genus: Salpingotus
 Heptner's pygmy jerboa, Salpingotus heptneri
Subfamily: Dipodinae
Genus: Dipus
 Northern three-toed jerboa, Dipus sagitta
Genus: Eremodipus
 Lichtenstein's jerboa, Eremodipus lichtensteini
Genus: Jaculus
 Turkmen jerboa, Jaculus turcmenicus
Genus: Paradipus
 Comb-toed jerboa, Paradipus ctenodactylus
Genus: Stylodipus
 Thick-tailed three-toed jerboa, Stylodipus telum
Family: Cricetidae
Subfamily: Arvicolinae
Genus: Blanfordimys
 Afghan vole, Blanfordimys afghanus
Genus: Ellobius
 Zaisan mole vole, Ellobius tancrei
Family: Muridae (mice, rats, voles, gerbils, hamsters)
Subfamily: Gerbillinae
Genus: Meriones
 Libyan jird, Meriones libycus LC
 Midday jird, Meriones meridianus
 Tamarisk jird, Meriones tamariscinus
Subfamily: Murinae
Genus: Nesokia
 Short-tailed bandicoot rat, Nesokia indica LC

Order: Lagomorpha (lagomorphs) 

The lagomorphs comprise two families, Leporidae with hares and rabbits, and Ochotonidae with pikas. Though they can resemble rodents, and were classified as a superfamily in that order until the early 20th century, they have since been considered a separate order.
Family: Leporidae
Genus: Lepus
Tolai hare, L. tolai 
Family: Ochotonidae
Genus: Ochotona
 Turkestan red pika, O. rutila

Order: Erinaceomorpha (hedgehogs and gymnures) 

The order Erinaceomorpha contains a single family, Erinaceidae, which comprise the hedgehogs and gymnures. The hedgehogs are easily recognised by their spines while gymnures look more like large rats.

Family: Erinaceidae (hedgehogs)
Subfamily: Erinaceinae
Genus: Hemiechinus
 Long-eared hedgehog, H. auritus 
Genus: Paraechinus
 Brandt's hedgehog, P. hypomelas

Order: Soricomorpha (shrews, moles, and solenodons) 

The "shrew-forms" are insectivorous mammals. The shrews and solenodons closely resemble mice while the moles are stout-bodied burrowers.
Family: Soricidae (shrews)
Subfamily: Crocidurinae
Genus: Crocidura
 Gueldenstaedt's shrew, C. gueldenstaedtii 
Lesser white-toothed shrew, C. suaveolens 
Genus: Diplomesodon
 Piebald shrew, D. pulchellum 
Subfamily: Soricinae
Tribe: Soricini
Genus: Sorex
 Eurasian pygmy shrew, S. minutus

Order: Chiroptera (bats) 

The bats' most distinguishing feature is that their forelimbs are developed as wings, making them the only mammals capable of flight. Bat species account for about 20% of all mammals.
Family: Vespertilionidae
Subfamily: Myotinae
Genus: Myotis
Long-fingered bat, M. capaccinii 
Geoffroy's bat, M. emarginatus 
 Fraternal myotis, M. frater 
 Bokhara whiskered bat, M. bucharensis 
Subfamily: Vespertilioninae
Genus: Eptesicus
 Bobrinski's serotine, E. bobrinskoi 
 Botta's serotine, E. bottae 
Serotine, E. serotinus 
Genus: Nyctalus
Greater noctule bat, N. lasiopterus 
Lesser noctule, N. leisleri 
Family: Rhinolophidae
Subfamily: Rhinolophinae
Genus: Rhinolophus
 Bokhara horseshoe bat, R. bocharicus 
Greater horseshoe bat, R. ferrumequinum 
Lesser horseshoe bat, R. hipposideros

Order: Carnivora (carnivorans) 

There are over 260 species of carnivorans, the majority of which feed primarily on meat. They have a characteristic skull shape and dentition.
Suborder: Feliformia
Family: Felidae (cats)
Subfamily: Felinae
Genus: Caracal
Caracal, C. caracal 
Genus: Felis
Jungle cat, F. chaus 
African wildcat, F. lybica 
Asiatic wildcat, F. l. ornata
Sand cat, F. margarita 
Genus: Lynx
 Eurasian lynx, L. lynx 
Genus: Otocolobus
Pallas's cat, O. manul 
Subfamily: Pantherinae
Genus: Panthera
Snow leopard, P. uncia 
Family: Hyaenidae (hyaenas)
Genus: Hyaena
Striped hyena, H. hyaena 
Suborder: Caniformia
Family: Canidae (dogs, foxes)
Genus: Canis
Golden jackal, C. aureus 
Gray wolf, C. lupus 
Genus: Vulpes
Corsac fox, V. corsac 
Red fox, V. vulpes 
Family: Ursidae (bears)
Genus: Ursus
Brown bear, U. arctos 
Family: Mustelidae (mustelids)
Genus: Lutra
Eurasian otter, L. lutra 
Genus: Meles
Asian badger, M. leucurus 
Genus: Mustela
Stoat, M. erminea 
Steppe polecat, M. eversmannii 
Least weasel, M. nivalis 
Genus: Vormela
Marbled polecat, V. peregusna

Order: Perissodactyla (odd-toed ungulates) 

The odd-toed ungulates are browsing and grazing mammals. They are usually large to very large, and have relatively simple stomachs and a large middle toe.
Family: Equidae (horses etc.)
Genus: Equus
 Onager, E. hemionus 
 Turkmenian kulan, E. h. kulan

Order: Artiodactyla (even-toed ungulates) 

The even-toed ungulates are ungulates whose weight is borne about equally by the third and fourth toes, rather than mostly or entirely by the third as in perissodactyls. There are about 220 artiodactyl species, including many that are of great economic importance to humans.
Family: Cervidae (deer)
Subfamily: Cervinae
Genus: Cervus
Central Asian red deer C. hanglu 
Bactrian deer, C. h. bactrianus
Family: Bovidae (cattle, antelope, sheep, goats)
Subfamily: Antilopinae
Genus: Gazella
Goitered gazelle, G. subgutturosa 
Genus: Saiga
Saiga antelope, S. tatarica 
Subfamily: Caprinae
Genus: Capra
Markhor, C. falconeri 
Siberian ibex, C. sibirica 
Genus: Ovis
 Argali, O. ammon 
Urial, O. vignei

Locally extinct 
The following species are locally extinct in Uzbekistan:
Cheetah, Acinonyx jubatus
Dhole, Cuon alpinus
Leopard, Panthera pardus
Tiger, Panthera tigris

References

See also
List of chordate orders
Lists of mammals by region
Mammal classification

.
Mammals
Uzbek
Uzbekistan